Henry Charles Berkeley Holmes (1878–1951) was a British boxer. He competed in the men's lightweight event at the 1908 Summer Olympics.

Biography
Henry Charles Berkeley Holmes was born in London in 1878. At the start of his boxing career, he won the 1905 Amateur Boxing Association British featherweight title, when boxing out of the 17th Middlesex Rifles BC. In 1908, he left the Columbia BC, joined the Polytechnic Boxing Club, won a second A.B.A title (this time at the lightweight class), and went on to compete in the 1908 Summer Olympics in that year.

References

External links
 

1878 births
1951 deaths
British male boxers
Olympic boxers of Great Britain
Boxers at the 1908 Summer Olympics
Lightweight boxers